Kangiqtualuk Uqquqti (Inuktitut syllabics: ᑲᖏᖅᑐᐊᓗᒃ ᐅᖅᑯᖅᑎ) formerly Sam Ford Fiord is an isolated, elongated Arctic fjord on Baffin Island's northeastern coast in the Qikiqtaaluk Region of Nunavut, Canada.

This fjord is reputed for the harsh beauty of its landscapes with rocky cliffs rising steeply from the shore. It is also a popular place with climbers.

History
Kangiqtualuk Uqquqti had been one of the traditional hunting areas of the Inuit. It was renamed in memory of Inuk linguist Sam Ford, who died in a helicopter crash but it has since reverted to its original name.

Geography

The Stewart Valley —with Sail Peaks stretches northwards from Walker Arm's northwest corner and connects with the neighbouring Gibbs Fiord. Swiss Bay is a smaller inlet on the eastern shore of Sam Ford Fiord connecting through Ottawa Creek and Atagulisaktalik with the inner reaches of neighbouring Arviqtujuq Kangiqtua in the east. The Sam Ford River discharges its waters at the head of the fjord further south and Qikiqtakuluk is located within the inner section of the fjord off a small bay  to the north northeast of the river's mouth.

Among the most impressive summits by the fjord Beluga Mountain, Rock Tower, Walrus Head Mountain, Broad Peak, Ottawa Peak, Sikunga Mountain, Turnagain Peak, and the Paalik Peak deserve mention.

See also
List of fjords in Canada
Baffin Mountains

References

External links
The massive rock walls of Sam Ford Fiord
Steep cliff at the southern entrance of Sam Ford Fjord
Sam Ford Fjord landscapes
Sam Ford Fjord - out of this world
Walrus Head; Time for a Rest
To the Ends of the Earth - BASE Jumping Baffin Island
Ted Davenport's Ski-BASE expedition
Канада Баффинова Земля 2007 (Russian)

Bodies of water of Baffin Island
Fjords of Qikiqtaaluk Region